Edwin Wheeler (June 28, 1828 – January 22, 1864) was an American lawyer, politician, and judge. He was a Wisconsin Circuit Court Judge for the last 3 years of his life, and served two years in the Wisconsin State Senate.

Biography
Born in Unionville, Ohio, in Lake County, Ohio, Wheeler studied law in Akron, Ohio, and in Madison, Wisconsin, and was admitted to the Wisconsin Bar in 1849. He moved to Neenah, Wisconsin, where he practiced law. In 1852, he moved to Oshkosh, Wisconsin, and was elected county judge for Winnebago County. Wheeler served in the Wisconsin State Senate 1857–1858. In 1861, Wheeler was elected Wisconsin Circuit Court judge serving until his death. He died in Oshkosh, Wisconsin.

Notes

1828 births
1864 deaths
People from Lake County, Ohio
Politicians from Neenah, Wisconsin
Politicians from Oshkosh, Wisconsin
Wisconsin lawyers
Wisconsin state court judges
Wisconsin state senators
19th-century American politicians
19th-century American judges
19th-century American lawyers